Francisco Javier García Brítez (born 25 November 1988) is a Paraguayan footballer who plays as a forward for ASD Montello.

Career
García's career began in Paraguay with Cerro Porteño, with the forward making eight appearances in the 2008 Paraguayan Primera División season. Rubio Ñu signed García in 2009. Thirty-four matches and one goal, versus ex-club Cerro Porteño on 31 October 2009, followed across two seasons. He rejoined Cerro Porteño in 2010, before moving to 3 de Febrero in 2011. García then featured in the Paraguayan División Intermedia for both Sport Colombia and Deportivo Capiatá between 2011 and 2012. 2014 saw García sign for Ecuador's Delfín. He scored six goals in Serie B that year, which included his first over UT Cotopaxi.

Two years later, in 2016, García returned to the second tier in Ecuador with Colón. Having featured twenty-six times, García joined Técnico Universitario in 2017. He had scored on two occasions for Colón against them in the previous year, while his first goal for Técnico Universitario arrived on 8 April versus Colón; in a season which ended as champions. In 2018, García switched Ecuador for Colombia by agreeing to play for Leones of Categoría Primera A. He made his debut during a home defeat to Alianza Petrolera in July, which was the first of eight overall fixtures as Leones were relegated; he was subsequently released.

In August 2019, following a stint with Martín Ledesma, it was confirmed that García had joined Italian Serie D club Calcio Cittanovese. He scored two goals in ten appearances for them. Ahead of January 2020, García signed for Eccellenza Veneto side ASD Montello.

Personal life
Whilst in Italian football with ASD Montello, García ran into serious financial difficulties due to the COVID-19 pandemic.

Career statistics
.

Honours
Técnico Universitario
Serie B: 2017

References

External links

1988 births
Living people
People from San Lorenzo, Paraguay
Paraguayan footballers
Association football forwards
Paraguayan expatriate footballers
Expatriate footballers in Ecuador
Expatriate footballers in Colombia
Expatriate footballers in Italy
Paraguayan expatriate sportspeople in Ecuador
Paraguayan expatriate sportspeople in Colombia
Paraguayan expatriate sportspeople in Italy
Paraguayan Primera División players
Ecuadorian Serie B players
Categoría Primera A players
Paraguayan Tercera División players
Serie D players
Cerro Porteño players
Club Rubio Ñu footballers
Club Atlético 3 de Febrero players
Sport Colombia footballers
Deportivo Capiatá players
Delfín S.C. footballers
C.D. Técnico Universitario footballers
Leones F.C. footballers
Club Martín Ledesma players